is a song by Miki Fujimoto, released as her third single on September 4, 2002, in Japan. It sold a total of 62,000 copies and is currently Fujimoto's highest-selling single. It is also her highest-charting single in Japan so far, and together with "Boyfriend" it is her longest-charting single in the Oricon top 200, having stayed on the chart for eleven weeks.

Track listing 
 
 
 "Romantic Ukare Mode" (Instrumental)

External links 
 Romantic Ukare Mode entry on the Up-Front Works official website

Miki Fujimoto songs
2002 singles
Songs written by Tsunku